Joseph Conrardy (11 October 1876 – 18 February 1949) was a Belgian painter. His work was part of the painting event in the art competition at the 1932 Summer Olympics.

References

1876 births
1949 deaths
20th-century Belgian painters
Belgian painters
Olympic competitors in art competitions
Place of birth missing